Margarella steineni is a species of sea snail, a marine gastropod mollusk in the family Calliostomatidae.

The species was named after Karl von den Steinen, who accompanied the German Antarctic expedition (1901–1903).

Description
The height of the shell attains 12.5 mm.

Distribution
This marine species occurs off the South Georgia Islands at depths between 0 m and 26 m.

References

External links
 To Biodiversity Heritage Library (5 publications)
 To Encyclopedia of Life
 To World Register of Marine Species
  Strebel, Beiträge zur Kenntnis der Molluskenfauna der Magalhaen-Provinz; Jena,Gustav Fischer,1904-1907

steineni
Gastropods described in 1905